Ornäs BK is a soccer club in Ornäs, Sweden, established 1982. The women's team played in the Swedish top division in 1999. The women's soccer section was inactive for a while during the first decade of the 2000s, before being restarted.

References

External links
 Official website 

1982 establishments in Sweden
Football clubs in Dalarna County
Sport in Dalarna County
Association football clubs established in 1982